Luke Jeffrey Dobie (born 7 October 1992) is an English former professional footballer who played as a midfielder.

Career

Youth career
Dobie started his career in the youth team of Crewe Alexandra, but left as a youngster to join Everton. He progressed through the youth system at Everton playing regularly for the youth team and reserve side. However, he was released from the club in 2011.

Middlesbrough
In April 2011 he was offered a trial at Championship side Middlesbrough, after he had impressed playing against the club in an FA Youth Cup tie earlier in the season. His trial was successful and he signed his first professional contract on a one-year deal.

Accrington Stanley (loan)
In October 2011, he joined League Two side Accrington Stanley on loan until January 2012. He made his debut for the club a day later in a 2–0 home defeat to Swindon Town, after coming on as a substitute for Andrew Procter. He made 4 appearances for the club before returning to Middlesbrough.

Return to Middlesbrough
He returned to Middlesbrough on 3 January 2012, at the end of his loan spell at League Two side Accrington Stanley. In June 2012 Luke was not offered a new contract by the management team at Middlesbrough and was subsequently released from the club.

Bristol City
He was picked up by Bristol City in 2012. He left Bristol City at the end of the season having not played a game for the club.

Wigan Athletic
On 14 January 2014, Dobie joined Wigan Athletic after a successful trial.

Personal life
Dobie attended Maricourt Catholic School and now owns multiple businesses in the takeaway food and drink industry.

References

External links

1992 births
Living people
People from Ormskirk
English footballers
Association football midfielders
Middlesbrough F.C. players
Accrington Stanley F.C. players
Wigan Athletic F.C. players
English Football League players
Bristol City F.C. players